is a 2009 Japanese film directed by Daisaku Kimura.

Cast
Tadanobu Asano as Shibasaki
Teruyuki Kagawa as Uji 
Ryuhei Matsuda as Ikuta 
Yukijirō Hotaru as Kinsaku Iwamoto 
Takashi Sasano as Noriaki Okubo
Toru Nakamura as Usui Kojima
Aoi Miyazaki as Hatsuyo Shibazaki
Renji Ishibashi as Sakichi Ogata
Hirofumi Arai as Akira Ushiyama
Hisashi Igawa as Nagamaru Saeki
Kōji Yakusho as Furuta

Awards
33rd Japan Academy Prize
 Won: Best Director - Daisaku Kimura
 Won: Best Supporting Actor - Teruyuki Kagawa
 Nominated: Best Film
 Nominated: Best Actor - Tadanobu Asano

References

External links
 

2009 films
Films directed by Daisaku Kimura
Mountaineering films
Films set in the Meiji period
2000s Japanese films